The Leader (Samuel Sterns) is a supervillain appearing in American comic books published by Marvel Comics. The Leader first appeared in Tales to Astonish #62, created by writer Stan Lee and artist Steve Ditko as the archenemy of the Hulk. He has mainly appeared in Hulk-related comic books over the years and was one of the featured characters in the Marvel NOW! Thunderbolts relaunch.

Sterns worked as a janitor in Boise, Idaho when he was exposed to gamma radiation. This mutated him into a green-skinned, super-intelligent entity who named himself the Leader, embarking on a career of attempts at world domination. He is repeatedly foiled by the Hulk, who overcomes all of the Leader's schemes as well as his artificial henchmen known as the Humanoids. Sterns would later be further transformed, causing his cranium to change into the shape of an oversized brain. As part of the Intelligencia, he is an integral part of the Hulked Out Heroes storyline. 

The character has been adapted from the comics into various forms of media, including television series and video games. Samuel Sterns made his cinematic debut in the Marvel Cinematic Universe (MCU) film The Incredible Hulk (2008), portrayed by Tim Blake Nelson, and will return in Captain America: New World Order (2024). In 2009, the Leader was ranked as IGN's 63rd Greatest Comic Book Villain of All Time.

Publication history
The character first appeared in Tales to Astonish #62 (December 1964), and was created by Stan Lee and Steve Ditko.

Fictional character biography
Born in Boise, Idaho, Samuel Sterns lived in the shadow of his brilliant brother Phillip, and he worked in a menial capacity for a chemical plant where Phillip was employed as a researcher. While Sterns was transporting radioactive materials, an explosive accident bombarded him with gamma radiation, which turned his skin green, abnormally enlarged his cranium and brain, and granted him a superhuman intellect that reflected his subconscious desire to be smarter than his brother. Calling himself "the Leader", he forms an espionage ring to overthrow the United States federal government, enlisting such spies as the Chameleon to steal its secrets. After his men are duly thwarted by the Hulk, the Leader decides to capture the Hulk with a powerful army of androids known as "Humanoids". However, the Hulk breaks free and destroys the Leader's laboratory, forcing his retreat. Impressed by the Hulk's strength, the Leader later convinces him to steal the Watcher's "Ultimate Machine", a device containing all the knowledge in the universe. After obtaining the device and visualizing its contents, the Leader apparently dies of shock.

One of the Leader's Humanoids specifically programmed to bring him back to life in the event of his death resurrects him with his Revivo-Beam, and he resurfaces after months of hiding to engage in a number of plots against the Hulk, including an alliance with General Ross. He also interrupts the wedding of Bruce Banner (the Hulk's alter ego) and Betty Ross by shooting Banner with a ray which restores the Hulk to his savage state, gamma-irradiates Manhattan's water supply to transform its inhabitants into loyal servants, and clashes with the Hulk and the Avengers twice. Eventually, the Leader's mutation destabilizes and he reverts to the form of Samuel Sterns. He convinces the Gray Hulk to transfer the gamma radiation from the recently Hulk-like Rick Jones into himself, and the Leader is restored with a new appearance and a psychic link to Rick. The Leader subsequently detonates a gamma bomb in a small town, Middletown, Arizona, killing over 5,000 people. The few, now enhanced, survivors provide him with valuable research subjects and a group of superhuman enforcers called the Riot Squad. With their help, he builds a self-sufficient society called Freehold in the Arctic, populated with civilians dying from radiation poisoning. When the Leader's brother Philip Sterns becomes the Madman, the Leader deems him a threat and sends the Hulk to eliminate him.

When Freehold is targeted by HYDRA, the Leader sends his followers to invade the covert Pantheon organization and coerce them into aiding Freehold. To the Hulk's chagrin, the Leader and the Pantheon's head Agamemnon ultimately form an alliance. At the same time, the Leader is experiencing Rick's grief over the recent death of his girlfriend Marlo Chandler. The Leader offers to revive Marlo by using the power of his follower Soul Man, hoping to use Rick as a pawn against the Hulk and taking the opportunity to analyze Soul Man's power in a bid to achieve immortality. Marlo's revival is interrupted by a two-pronged attack on Freehold by the Hulk and HYDRA, and the Leader is apparently killed in the crossfire. The now-incorporeal Leader controls his follower Omnibus and attempts to throw the world into a state of war. Omnibus is eventually exposed by his fellow Freehold citizens, exiled into the Arctic, and is eaten by a polar bear.

When Banner is dying from ALS, the Hulk is summoned by the Leader, who had created a new body from various organic materials. The Leader tells the Hulk that he is preparing to transcend the mortal plane, and he grants the Hulk the cure to Banner's condition in exchange for the Hulk bearing witness to his ascension. However, the Leader's body explodes at a crucial juncture. Later, Banner mentally hears the Leader begging him for help, having apparently made a grave mistake. The Leader is ultimately abandoned by Banner, who is unable to help.

The Leader survives once more as a large disembodied head in a tank within a hidden California base. Planning to create a new body from the Hulk's DNA, the Leader establishes the clandestine organization Home Base and dispatches agents to pursue the Hulk after framing him for the death of a young boy. After all his other agendas fail, the Leader finally manages to mind-control the Hulk and guides him towards his secret base, with the intention of taking his indestructible body for himself. Because of intervention by Nadia Blonsky, Betty Ross, Doc Samson, and Iron Man, the plan fails and the Leader dies again.

After the Leader regains his body through unknown means, he is captured by S.H.I.E.L.D. and brought to trial for his crimes, but his attorney manages to have him found not guilty by reason of insanity. Shortly afterward, the Leader discovers he is dying and builds a dome in a Nevada desert to survive. Upon recovering, he joins the Intelligencia, and he takes part in the creation of the Harpy II (Marlo Chandler), the Red Hulk (General Ross), and the Red She-Hulk (Betty Ross). However, when Ross discovers that the Red She-Hulk is actually his daughter, he furiously drains the gamma radiation from the Leader's body, depriving him of his super-intelligence and reverting him back to Samuel Sterns.

Subsequently taken into custody so that he may divulge information on the Intelligencia's plans, Sterns is subjected to a dose of red gamma radiation by the Red Hulk, who intends to make Sterns his intelligence agent. However, Sterns is shot and killed when the Punisher discovers him. The Red Hulk further exposes his body to gamma radiation, which revives him and transforms him into the Red Leader. Initially forced to work for Ross's Thunderbolts, the Red Leader manages to escape and begins to rebuild his criminal empire, but is recaptured. He makes a pact with Mephisto to free himself, and is later dragged to Hell.

After somehow escaping from Mephisto's captivity, the Red Leader is tracked down by "Doc Green", an ingenious and ruthless new personality of the Hulk, and is deprived of his powers. However, the Red Leader had previously taken possession of an artificial intelligence created by Banner, which restores his powers and original green complexion.

In the miniseries Hulkverines, the Leader is shown to be detained at Shadow Base Remote Facility 43B using Big Bob's Lumber Lounge in Akron, Ohio as a front. He is approached by Agent Castillo, who informs him that the Hulk has returned from the dead and they need his help to kill him. The Leader accepts, but stabs Agent Castillo, stating that he would rather do it himself. The Leader arrives at the area where the Hulk and Weapon H are fighting each other, until Shadow Base agents led by Agent NG catch up to him. As the Hulk starts sneezing, the Leader states to Agent NG that he infected Clayton Cortez with a gamma-altering virus. Arriving where Weapon H had knocked the Hulk unconscious, the Leader begs for Weapon H to finish him off. When the Leader threatens his family as part of Plan C, he detonates some bombs near Weapon H to get away. Clayton chases after the Leader until Wolverine arrives. The Leader brings out the Humanoids, only to be regressed back to their pods by reverse-engineered Humanoids when former Weapon X Project scientist Dr. Aliana Alba shows up. She advises the Leader to leave the disposal of Wolverine to her. After a brief fight, the Leader explains that he was pursuing the Hulk, while Dr. Alba states that she was pursuing Wolverine. They come to a conclusion that they were manipulated by someone who wants Weapon H dead. This leads to them making plans to capture the Hulk to collaborate on a project. The Leader and Dr. Alba later attack Shadow Base's Remote Facility FN34. After the larger Humanoid abducts Wolverine and Bruce Banner, it brings them to Shadow Base's Remote Facility FN34 as they begin the experiment that gives the Hulk the claws of Wolverine and Wolverine the strength of the Hulk. The Leader and Dr. Alba unleash the mutated Hulk and Wolverine on Shadow Base Auto-Op WMD Facility BX91 in Central, Ohio using Green Energy Corp as a front. Weapon H arrives and lures them towards the Leader and Dr. Alba. When Weapon H destroys the remote control in the Leader's hand, Dr. Alba withdraws the nanobots that were placed in Wolverine and Bruce Banner and places them in Weapon H. It does not work on Weapon H, as the Leader repairs his teleporter enough to get himself and Dr. Alba away from Weapon H. After watching the aftermath from afar, the Leader and Dr. Alba share a romantic kiss as they embrace each other.

After the Hulk left after finding that Xemnu the Living Titan devoured the Minotaur and transformed him into a Xemnu/Minotaur hybrid, the Leader visits him. While controlling Rick Jones when spying on the Hulk, the Leader advises the Minotaur to leave the Hulk to him.

The Leader begins working on studying the Below-Place where gamma mutates travel to after dying and before resurrecting. He began to learn how to control the Green Door while in the Below-Place. He encountered Brian Banner, who wanted the Leader to help him escape the Below-Place. Instead, the Leader removed his skeleton for research. Following the Hulk's victory over Xemnu, the Leader had Rick Jones send a surge of gamma energy into the Hulk during a photo shoot, which caused him to release a blast of gamma energy where the survivors were saved by Rick Jones, who was mutated to an elongated and multi-limbed form. Gamma Flight came to confront the Hulk, which the Leader commented on. Then, the Leader controlled Del Frye so that he could send Doc Samson to the Below-Place and watch his plans unfold. During the Hulk's fight with the Absorbing Man, Puck fired an energy beam on the Hulk, as the Leader had planned. The Leader used the Green Door to take over the Hulk and his Green Scar persona. In Bruce's mindscape, the Leader tied up Bruce and the Hulk personas to the prison that held the Devil Hulk inside. The Leader bragged to Bruce how he was using the Green Door to take control of his mind. He then began to hit snags when he tried to entice Dr. Charlene McGowan of the U.S. Hulk Operations to join him. While the Leader was distracted, Samson struck him with a piece of debris, inflicting a severe head injury. McGowan then used a translocator to split Rick in two, which the Leader felt. Seeing his plans were on thin ice, the Leader decided to drag Bruce through the Green Door immediately instead of making him suffer. This unexpectedly caused the Devil Hulk to get angry enough to finally break free from his prison and confront the Leader, causing him to become very fearful. The Leader was able to distract the Devil Hulk briefly by tuning into Brian Banner before transforming into a crab-like monstrosity and grabbing Brian. The Devil Hulk tried to fight the Leader, but was unexpectedly restrained by the Savage Hulk persona, who believed that he was Brian and decided to protect him so he could be loved by him. With the Devil Hulk restrained, the Leader killed him and dragged his remains and Bruce through the Green Door. Now in the Below-Place, the Leader hooked Bruce and the Devil Hulk's remains to strange plant-like structures for the purpose of turning him into a device to channel gamma energy to the One Below All. However, the Leader could not get the system to work, even though Brian could. Then, the Leader learned the truth about Brian's spirit: Brian could do it because he was possessed by the One Below All, something the Leader did not want. After that, it possessed him, much to his horror. The Leader eventually grew to a gargantuan size and built a fortress around himself. The Savage Hulk, Joe Fixit, and Jackie McGee managed to travel to the Below-Place using the Fantastic Four's Forever Gate and confronted him. However, the Leader ensnared the Savage Hulk with his tendrils and controlled him like a puppet to fight Joe so he could absorb them both. When Jackie came to terms with her past, she unleashed a beam that harmed the Leader, allowing Joe and the Savage Hulk to separate him from the One Below All and unexpectedly depower him as well. After the Hulk personas talked with the One-Above-All, the Savage Hulk forgave Sterns for all he did. Sterns was then returned to Earth with Jackie, Bruce, and the Hulk personas, where he was shackled and presumably taken into police custody.

During the "Empyre" story line, it was revealed that the Leader also used the Green Door to return the She-Hulk to life after she was possessed by a Cotati.

Powers and abilities
The Leader has superhuman mental acumen as a result of his exposure to an explosion of gamma-irradiated waste. He is capable of knowledge and comprehension that is beyond the human ability to understand. Just as the Hulk has the potential for limitless strength, the Leader has the potential for limitless intelligence, being capable of mastering every worldly subject and adopting concepts completely foreign to his environment. His higher brain functions, including pattern recognition, information storage/retrieval and logical/philosophical structuring have been enhanced to inhuman levels. He also has total recall of every event he has witnessed since the accident that transformed him and can calculate possibilities and outcomes so accurately that it borders on predicting the future. Despite his limitless intelligence and supreme knowledge, his effectiveness is greatly hampered by his own arrogance, impatience and obsession with defeating the Hulk, which constantly causes him to lose sight of necessary details and act prematurely, causing the ruin of his schemes. His egotism also led him to embark on two mad and impractical schemes to turn the rest of humanity into green-skinned beings like himself.

He has also unlocked latent telekinetic and telepathic powers within himself. He is able to control the minds of ordinary humans by merely touching them (aside from gamma-mutated individuals like the Hulk or the Abomination), mind-wipe the memories of several humans at once, create illusions to trick others or disguise himself, and project telekinetic blasts potent enough to topple a very weakened Hulk.

The Leader is also a technological genius that specializes in gamma radiation. He has created technology that is beyond human ability, including vehicles, weaponry, computers, laser pistols, pulse weapons and kinetic gauntlets, and is particularly adept at genetic engineering and manipulating radiation for many nefarious purposes. The Leader has created an army of synthetic henchmen at his disposal called "Humanoids" that have served him throughout his career of world domination, mainly as bodyguards, soldiers and laboratory servants. They have versatile programming capacities to allow them to perform any task, do not tire, talk or need sustenance and have elastic-like bodies that make them immune to blunt impacts. They range in size from microscopic to hundreds of feet tall. The Humanoids are usually controlled directly through the Leader's own mental commands, but can also be pre-programmed to carry out a certain directive. The Leader has also developed gamma bombs, shield generators to cover large areas, cages for holding the Hulk, powered armor, teleportation devices, android duplicates, a means of controlling the minds of the Hulk or the Rhino through technological devices, a special Humanoid which was programmed to bring him back to life in the event of his death by using a Revivo-Beam and Omnivac, a sentient computer that maintains the enormous space station he has used as a base of operations.

On occasion, the Leader has been shown to have the ability to change himself back into Samuel Sterns, but this ability resulted in him losing all memory of his identity as the Leader, as Sterns' mind was ill-equipped to cope with the Leader's intellect (although he always remembered everything when he changed back into the Leader again).

Although the Leader can be killed, being a gamma mutate, he is able to resurrect himself each time he is by passing through the Green Door, which makes him virtually immortal.

Other versions

Marvel Cinematic Universe tie-in issues
Prior to the release of The Avengers in 2012, Marvel ran a series of canon tie-in comics entitled Avengers Prelude: Fury's Big Week, which take place within the Marvel Cinematic Universe. In issues #6-7, Sterns is seen undergoing a rapid head mutation just as he is discovered by Natasha Romanoff who stumbles upon him immediately after the Hulk has escaped (which happens during the climax of The Incredible Hulk, while the Hulk is fighting the Abomination). Although his brainpower has already drastically increased to the point where he can pinpoint the exact location of the Black Widow's birth just by a brief hint of Stalingrad in her accent, Natasha shoots him in the leg when he attempts to bribe her by offering to help her return to her home and he is taken into S.H.I.E.L.D. custody.

Marvel Zombies
The Leader makes an appearance as a zombie in Marvel Zombies vs. The Army of Darkness in the horde that overwhelms and infects the Punisher. He has a giant hole blown through his cranium, which does not stop him. He is also in Marvel Zombies 3 where he is looking over food and medical supplies that other zombies have found as an offering to the Zombie Kingpin. The Zombie Leader determines how long the others can feed on the human clones. The Zombie Leader is sent with other zombified superbeings to find and destroy Machine Man. The android gains the upper hand in the battle and destroys all his pursuers. The Zombie Leader then kills himself by ripping out his arm, using it to take out all of his brain, and ripping out his own body.

Ultimate Marvel
The Ultimate Marvel equivalent of the Leader is an enemy of Iron Man and the Hulk. In Ultimate Human, Pete Wisdom is an ex-British Intelligence agent thrown out of MI6 after testing his "British Enhancile Program" on himself, transforming him into the Leader. Wisdom has psychic and mental abilities similar to the original Leader, but requires a wheelchair and a halo brace to support the weight of his enlarged cranium's weight. The Leader attempts to steal Tony Stark's nanotechnology, as Bruce Banner and Stark work together to try to incorporate into Banner's physiology in the hopes that it will grant control over the Hulk. When Stark commands a decoy Iron-Tech robot into the Leader's base, Banner transforms into the Hulk. The Hulk resists the Leader's influence, and pounds him into the ground. The Leader, almost dead, commands a C-17 down onto the Hulk, ultimately killing Wisdom.

The Ultimate version of Samuel Sterns is an elderly doctor who is seen in a wheelchair. In Ultimate Mystery, he is amongst a brain trust group for Roxxon Industries, including Doctor Octopus, Arnim Zola, Misty Knight, Nathaniel Essex, and Dr. Layla Miller. He has the ability to transform into a hybrid of the Hulk and the Leader, but is defeated by the original Spider-Man, and later the new Spider-Man on two different occasions involving Spider-Woman.

Reception
In 2009, the Leader was ranked as IGN's 63rd Greatest Comic Book Villain of All Time.

In other media

Television
 The Leader appears in "The Incredible Hulk" segment of The Marvel Super Heroes, voiced by Gillie Fenwick.
 The Leader appears in the 1980s The Incredible Hulk series episode "Punks on Wheels", voiced by G. Stanley Jones.
 The Leader appears in the Iron Man episode "Hulkbuster", voiced by Matt Frewer.
 The Leader appears in the 1990s The Incredible Hulk series, voiced again by Matt Frewer. This version was a scientist who sabotaged the gamma bomb that turned Bruce Banner into the Hulk. As the latter event happened, Sterns fell into a pit of radioactive waste created by the gamma bomb and was mutated into the Leader. Additionally, he is served by the Gargoyle, the Abomination, the Ogress, and the Gamma Warriors.
 The Leader makes a non-speaking cameo appearance in The Super Hero Squad Show episode "Tremble at the Might of... M.O.D.O.K.!".
 The Leader appears in The Avengers: Earth's Mightiest Heroes, voiced by Jeffrey Combs. Introduced in the episode "Hulk vs. the World", he is initially imprisoned in the Cube before a technological fault allows the inmates to escape and take over in "The Breakout, Part 1". In the two-part episode "Gamma World", the Leader joins forces with the Abomination, the Absorbing Man, the Wrecking Crew, the U-Foes, and Zzzax to turn the world into gamma monsters, but they are thwarted by the Avengers. As of "Assault on 42", the Leader has been remanded to the titular Prison 42, where he warns the Avengers of Annihilus and the Annihilation Wave with his psionic powers.
 The Leader appears in the Hulk and the Agents of S.M.A.S.H., voiced by James Arnold Taylor. This version employed Skaar until the Hulk frees him from the Leader's control and fights the titular Agents of S.M.A.S.H. on several occasions.
 The Leader appears in the Ultimate Spider-Man episode "Contest of Champions" Pt. 3, voiced again by James Arnold Taylor.
 The Leader appears in Avengers Assemble, voiced again by James Arnold Taylor. Following minor appearances in the episodes "Building the Perfect Weapon" and "World War Hulk", the Leader appears in the two-part episode "Avengers No More" as the apparent leader of the Cabal, whom he leads in stealing a prototype Arc Reactor and Vibranium to build a Static Expander. While they come into conflict with the Avengers, the Cabal capture them and scatter them across time and space. In response, the Black Panther gathers the Avengers' reserve members to fight back. The heroes defeat the Leader and take him into custody, but the rest of the Cabal abandon the Leader and escape.
 The Leader appears in Marvel Future Avengers, voiced by Yoshihito Sasaki in Japanese and Benjamin Diskin in English. This version is a member of Kang the Conqueror's Masters of Evil.
 The Leader appears in the M.O.D.O.K. episode "If Saturday Be... For the Boys!", voiced by Bill Hader.

Film
 Dr. Samuel Sterns appears in the Marvel Cinematic Universe (MCU) film The Incredible Hulk (2008), portrayed by Tim Blake Nelson. This version is a Harlem-based university professor who secretly attempts to help Bruce Banner find a cure for his transformations via various samples of Banner's blood under the alias of "Mr. Blue". After a trial run to control the Hulk mutation, Sterns reveals he replicated the samples to Banner before the latter is captured by General Ross and Sterns is forced to transform Emil Blonsky into the Abomination. After the latter injures Sterns and destroys his lab, one of Banner's blood samples drips into Sterns' open head wound, causing his cranium to rapidly expand.
 Nelson will reprise his role as Sterns in the upcoming MCU film Captain America: New World Order (2024).

Video games
 The Leader appears in The Incredible Hulk 1994 video game.
 The Leader appears in the 2003 Hulk film tie-in game, voiced by Michael Dobson. This version possesses levitation and teleportation capabilities as well as psionic abilities such as telekinesis, energy projection, and creating illusions of himself. He plans to create a gamma mutant army to take over the world from New Freehold using a special "Gamma Orb", with help from his brother, the Madman, and fellow enemies of the Hulk such as Ravage and Halflife.
 Dr. Samuel Sterns appears in The Incredible Hulk 2008 film tie-in game, voiced by Tim Blake Nelson.
 The Leader appears as a playable character in Lego Marvel Super Heroes, voiced again by Jeffrey Combs.
 The Leader appears in Marvel: Avengers Alliance. In Spec Ops 32, he kidnaps Betty Ross and turns her into the Red She-Hulk. After he is defeated by the Red Hulk, the Leader turns himself into the Red Leader.
 The Leader appears as a playable character in Lego Marvel's Avengers.
 The Leader appears as a playable character in Marvel Avengers Academy.

Literature
The Leader appears in the X-Men/Avengers crossover trilogy Gamma Quest by Greg Cox. He forms an alliance with the Super-Skrull to enhance his abilities with the powers of various other superhumans, but during the final confrontation Rogue is able to borrow enough of the Leader's intellect to reverse the procedure and return the Skrull to his usual power levels.

References

External links
 Leader at Marvel.com

Characters created by Stan Lee
Characters created by Steve Ditko
Comics characters introduced in 1964
Fictional characters from Idaho
Fictional characters with nuclear or radiation abilities
Fictional janitors
Fictional mass murderers
Marvel Comics characters who have mental powers
Marvel Comics mutates
Marvel Comics scientists
Marvel Comics supervillains
Marvel Comics telekinetics
Marvel Comics telepaths
Villains in animated television series